Alora may refer to:

 Alora (gastropod), a genus of wentletraps in the family Epitoniidae
 Alora (drug), a brand name for transdermal Estradiol
 Álora, a town in southern Spain